The Point Loma Sea Lions (officially Point Loma Nazarene Sea Lions or PLNU Sea Lions) are the athletic teams that represent Point Loma Nazarene University, located in San Diego, California, in intercollegiate sports as a member of the Division II level of the National Collegiate Athletic Association (NCAA), primarily competing in the Pacific West Conference (PacWest) since the 2012–13 academic year. They were also a member of the National Christian College Athletic Association (NCCAA), primarily competing as an independent in the West Region of the Division I level. The Sea Lions previously competed in the Golden State Athletic Conference (GSAC) of the National Association of Intercollegiate Athletics (NAIA) from 1986–87 to 2011–12.

Point Loma became an active member in the NCAA since the summer of 2014, which signified the conclusion of their three-year transition process from the NAIA to NCAA Division II.

History
In 2002, the mascot was changed from the Crusaders to the Sea Lions. In 2013, Point Loma Athletics also dropped the usage of its 'mythical beast of the sea' logo and its Vegas Gold Color. The Sea Lions added Sunset Gold to their color scheme and also updated their logo, with the help of Joe Bosack Co., to create the current PLNU Athletic Word Mark and Crest.

PLNU has won the National Scholastic Surfing Association college national championship six times, in 1989, 1999, and 2015-2018. Women's golf was added to replace the softball program that was dropped in 2010 due to the lack of a suitable and permanent playing field.

Varsity teams
Point Loma competes in 11 intercollegiate varsity sports: Men's sports include baseball, basketball, soccer and tennis; while women's sports include basketball, cross country, golf, soccer, tennis, track & field and volleyball.

References

External links